Ratsitl is a rural locality (a selo) in Verkhneinkhelinsky Selsoviet, Akhvakhsky District, Republic of Dagestan, Russia. The population was 114 as of 2010.

Geography 
Ratsitl is located 23 km north of Karata (the district's administrative centre) by road. Tsoloda is the nearest rural locality.

References 

Rural localities in Akhvakhsky District